Kadenang Ginto (International title: The Heiress / ) is a 2018 Philippine drama revenge television series broadcast by ABS-CBN. Directed by Jerry Lopez Sineneng, it stars Francine Diaz, Andrea Brillantes, Beauty Gonzalez, Dimples Romana, Albert Martinez, Louise Abuel, Adrian Alandy and Richard Yap. The series was aired on the network's Kapamilya Gold afternoon block and worldwide via The Filipino Channel from October 8, 2018, to February 7, 2020, replacing Asintado, and was replaced by Love Thy Woman.

The series proved to be a huge hit in the Philippines. It is one of a few daytime television dramas to last for more than a year due to maintaining high viewership. The rivalry of Cassie and Marga (Francine Diaz and Andrea Brillantes), two of the series' main characters, became a trending topic nationwide. Furthermore, a scene which featured Daniela (Dimples Romana) wearing a red dress while pulling a luggage bag became viral on various social media platforms, helping Romana's popularity and career reach new heights. In addition, one of the most famous lines in the show, "Cassie, ‘di ka muna papasok sa school." – uttered by Daniela – easily became the show's catchphrase among the viewers.

Premise
Kadenang Ginto is the story of Romina Andrada (Beauty Gonzalez), a secretary turned wife of business tycoon Robert Mondragon (Albert Martinez), who married her even though she was raped and was carrying the child of the assailant. Unknown to Romina, it was Daniela (Dimples Romana), Robert's daughter, who had orchestrated her abduction right before seducing Romina's fiancé, Carlos Bartolome (Adrian Alandy). With their lives intertwined, their daughters, Cassandra (Francine Diaz) and Margaret (Andrea Brillantes), are made to fight as to who is the rightful heiress to Robert's empire.

Cast and characters

Main cast
 Francine Diaz as Cassandra "Cassie" A. Mondragon
 Beauty Gonzalez as Romina Andrada-Mondragon
 Andrea Brillantes as Margaret "Marga" M. Bartolome
 Dimples Romana as Daniela "Dani" Mondragon-Bartolome
 Albert Martinez as Roberto "Robert" Aquino-Mondragon
 Adrian Alandy as Carlos Bartolome
 Richard Yap as Leonardo "Leon" Herrera

Supporting cast
 Kyle Echarri as  Kristoff "Tope" Tejada
 Seth Fedelin as Michael "Mikoy" Sarmiento
 Susan Africa as Esther Magtira
 Donita Rose as Claire Herrera
 Ronnie Lazaro as Nicolas "Kulas" Bartolome
 Joko Diaz as Hector Mangubat
 Eric Fructuoso as Alvin Mangubat
 Aleck Bovick as Myrna Bartolome
 Sheree Bautista as Jessa Trinidad
 Arnold Reyes as Atty. Bernard Tejada
 Kim Molina as Savannah Savi Rosales
 Luke Conde as PO3 Jude Bartolome
 Nikko Natividad as Gino Bartolome
 Kat Galang as Bonita Marilet
 Adrian Lindayag as Neil Andrada
 Josh Ivan Morales as Jepoy Marilet
 Angelina Kanapi as Juanita "Ninang" Galvez
 Cecille Jamora Santos as Principal #1
 Danica Ontengco as Nadya Ricaforte
 CJ de Guzman as Nica de Guzman
 Bea Borres as Maureen Gatchalian
 Bea Basa as Fatima  Paterno
 Julie Esguerra as Leslie Joy "LJ" Catacutan
 Criza Taa as Roxanne Roxy Mangubat
 Benj Manalo as Felix Dimalanta
 Alynna Velasquez as Principal Garcia

Guest cast and cameo appearances
 Eula Valdez as Rosanna Andrada
 Mickey Ferriols as Camilla Mondragon
 Eva Darren as Cecilia "Cely" Mangubat
 Valerie Concepcion as Cindy Dimaguiba
 Mel Martinez as Joaquin "Wacky" Dumagat
 Abby Bautista as Trina Martinez
 Ping Medina as Badong Sarmiento
 Brenna Garcia as Jenna Carvajal
 Glydel Mercado as Rosita Carvajal
 Nico Antonio as Ramon Evangelista
 Louise Abuel as Paco  Herrera
 Ana Abad Santos as Eva Romero
 Kate Ramos as young Cassie
 Angelika Rama as young Marga
 Lou Veloso as Waldo
 Winnie Cordero as herself
 Bea Alonzo
 Angel Locsin
 Belle Mariano
 Angelo Acosta

Broadcast
Kadenang Ginto premiered on October 8, 2018, on ABS-CBN. The series was the network's second longest-running afternoon drama series of the 2010s with a total of 348 episodes.

In 2020, it re-aired on the newly launched Kapamilya Channel via pay cable and satellite, under the title Kadenang Ginto: The Golden Comeback from August 22, 2020, to May 1, 2021, every weekend. However, on May 8, 2021, the re-run of the series was replaced by the extension of Kapamilya Action Sabado and the re-run of Philippine television series, Parasite Island, Hiwaga ng Kambat, Uncoupling, and We Rise Together. As a result, the remaining episodes until the finale moved to Jeepney TV from May 3, 2021, to March 18, 2022.

Adaptation
In January 2020, an Indonesian remake of Kadenang Ginto was announced. The Verona Pictures-produced adaptation, titled Putri Mahkota, debuted on January 5, 2020, on ANTV. It aired for 22 episodes of 110 minutes each until January 26, 2020.

Ratings

Accolades

Awards and nominations

See also
 List of programs broadcast by ABS-CBN
 List of ABS-CBN drama series

References

External links
 
 

ABS-CBN drama series
Philippine telenovelas
Philippine drama television series
Philippine melodrama television series
Philippine thriller television series
2018 Philippine television series debuts
2020 Philippine television series endings
Television series by Dreamscape Entertainment Television
Filipino-language television shows
Television shows set in Metro Manila
Television series set in the 2000s
Television series set in 2003